The Canton of Eu is a canton situated in the Seine-Maritime département and in the Normandy region of northern France.

Geography 
An area of farming, fishing, forestry and light industry (especially glassmaking) in the arrondissement of Dieppe, centred on the town of Eu. The altitude varies from 0m (Villy-sur-Yères) to 189m (Melleville) for an average altitude of 57m.

Composition 
At the French canton reorganisation which came into effect in March 2015, the canton was expanded from 22 to 40 communes:

Aubermesnil-aux-Érables
Baromesnil
Bazinval
Blangy-sur-Bresle
Campneuseville
Canehan
Criel-sur-Mer
Cuverville-sur-Yères
Dancourt
Étalondes
Eu
Fallencourt
Flocques
Foucarmont
Guerville
Hodeng-au-Bosc
Incheville
Longroy
Melleville
Le Mesnil-Réaume
Millebosc
Monchaux-Soreng
Monchy-sur-Eu
Nesle-Normandeuse
Pierrecourt
Ponts-et-Marais
Réalcamp
Rétonval
Rieux
Saint-Léger-aux-Bois
Saint-Martin-au-Bosc
Saint-Martin-le-Gaillard
Saint-Pierre-en-Val
Saint-Rémy-Boscrocourt
Saint-Riquier-en-Rivière
Sept-Meules
Touffreville-sur-Eu
Le Tréport
Villers-sous-Foucarmont
Villy-sur-Yères

Population

See also 
 Arrondissements of the Seine-Maritime department
 Cantons of the Seine-Maritime department
 Communes of the Seine-Maritime department

References

Eu